The fourth season of Will & Grace premiered on September 27, 2001 and concluded on May 16, 2002. It consisted of 27 episodes.

Cast and characters

Main cast 
 Eric McCormack as Will Truman
 Debra Messing as Grace Adler
 Megan Mullally as Karen Walker
 Sean Hayes as Jack McFarland
 Shelley Morrison as Rosario Salazar
 Michael Angarano as Elliot

Recurring cast 
 Woody Harrelson as Nathan
 Marshall Manesh as Mr. Zamir
 Tim Bagley as Larry
 Leslie Jordan as Beverley Leslie
 Tom Gallop as Rob
 Leigh-Allyn Baker as Ellen

Special guest stars 
 Adam Goldberg as Kevin Wolchek
 Eileen Brennan as Zandra
 Parker Posey as Dorleen
 Debbie Reynolds as Bobbi Adler
 Lainie Kazan as Aunt Honey
 Beau Bridges as Daniel McFarland
 Blythe Danner as Marilyn Truman
 Lesley Ann Warren as Tina
 Rosie O'Donnell as Bonnie
 Matt Damon as Owen
 Sandra Bernhard as herself
 Suzanne Pleshette as Lois Whitley
 Sydney Pollack as George Truman
 Michael Douglas as Detective Gavin Hatch
 Molly Shannon as Val Bassett
 Glenn Close as Fannie Lieber
 Rip Torn as Lionel Banks
 Cher as herself

Guest stars 
 Landry Allbright as Nancy
 Douglas Sills as Teddy Bowers
 Anne Meara as Mrs. Friedman
 Kenneth Mars as Uncle Sid
 Jon Tenney as Paul Truman
 Helen Slater as Peggy Truman
 Nick Offerman as Nick
 Larry Sullivan as Robert
 Kirk Baltz as Glenn Gabriel
 Tom Verica as Danny
 Jennifer Aspen as Sarah
 Maggie Wheeler as Polly
 Peter Mackenzie as Mean Guy
 Tom Poston as Norman
 J.P. Manoux as Minion
 Laura Kightlinger as Nurse Sheila

Episodes

Awards and nominations

Emmy Awards

Will & Grace earned 13 Primetime Emmy Awards nominations in the summer of 2002, and won two awards.

Notes

References

4
2001 American television seasons
2002 American television seasons
Television episodes directed by James Burrows